Julien Rinaldi (born 27 April 1979) is a French former professional rugby league footballer who played for the Wakefield Trinity Wildcats, Catalans Dragons, London Broncos and the Bradford Bulls in the Super League. He also played for and coaches the Villeneuve Leopards in the Elite One Championship in France. Rinaldi was a France international.

Rinaldi has also played for the Bradford Bulls, Sunshine Coast Sea Eagles, the Catalans Dragons and the Wakefield Trinity Wildcats.

Background
Rinaldi was born in Villeneuve-sur-Lot, France.

Playing career
He was named in the France squad for the 2008 Rugby League World Cup.
Rinaldi signed a one-month deal to play for the Wakefield Trinity Wildcats after returning from France. He then signed a new contract to remain with Wakefield Trinity until the end of the 2011 season.

References

External links
"My life in rugby league: Julien Rinaldi" interview at TotalRL.com
Quins RL profile

1979 births
Living people
Bradford Bulls players
Catalans Dragons players
France national rugby league team captains
France national rugby league team players
French rugby league players
London Broncos players
Rugby league halfbacks
Rugby league hookers
Sunshine Coast Sea Eagles players
Villeneuve Leopards players
Wakefield Trinity players